"Enoch Arden" is a narrative poem published in 1864 by Alfred, Lord Tennyson.

Enoch Arden may also refer to:
 Enoch Arden (1911 film), an American, two-part short silent drama directed by D. W. Griffith and starring Wilfred Lucas
 Enoch Arden (1914 film), a British silent drama directed by Percy Nash and starring Gerald Lawrence
 Enoch Arden (1915 film), an American short drama directed by Christy Cabanne and starring Alfred Paget
 Enoch Arden (Strauss), Op. 38, TrV. 181, a melodrama for narrator and piano, written in 1897 by Richard Strauss
 Enoch Arden law, a legal precedent in the United States that grants a divorce or a legal exemption so that a person can remarry in the event of a spouse's absence